Brown cow may refer to:

 A cow that is brown
 Brown Cow (yogurt), a brand of yogurt from Antioch, California
 How now brown cow, a speaking exercise
 Brown Cow cocktail, a cocktail made with Kahlúa, milk, and in some versions nutmeg

 Another name for a Root beer float